Roger Nordmann (born 23 March 1973) is a Swiss politician. He is a member of the National Council for the canton of Vaud since 2004 and presides the Social Democratic group in the Swiss parliament since 2015.

Life and career 
Roger Nordmann was born on 23 March 1973 in Lausanne. He was communal councillor of Lausanne from 1998 to 1999; he was elected to the Vaud Constituant Assembly in 1999 then sat in the Grand Council of Vaud for a few months in 2004.

He was elected to the National Council in 2004 and re-elected in the 2007, 2011, 2015, and 2019 Swiss federal elections. As of September 2022, he is president of the Social Democratic group since 2015.

References 

1973 births
Living people
Members of the National Council (Switzerland)
Social Democratic Party of Switzerland politicians